Skip Young may refer to:

 Skip Young (actor), 1930–1993, born Robert Plumstead
 Skip Young (wrestler), 1951–2010, born Galton W. Young